The Indian state of Telangana has 33 districts, each headed by a District collector.

History 

Telangana region of Hyderabad State consisted of 8 Districts in 1948 when it was inducted in Dominion of India; they are Hyderabad, Mahbubnagar, Medak, Nalgonda, Nizamabad, Adilabad, Karimnagar and Warangal districts. Khammam district was created by bifurcation of Warangal district on 1 October 1953. Andhra Pradesh was formed by merging Telangana region of Hyderabad State and Andhra state on 1 November 1956. Bhadrachalam division and Aswaraopet taluka parts was merged in Khammam district from Godavari districts for better Administration. Hyderabad district was split into Hyderabad Urban District and Hyderabad Rural District on 15 August 1978. Hyderabad Urban District was made by 4 Talukas are Charminar, Golkonda, Mushirabad and Secunderabad Talukas which consist of only MCH area, Secunderabad cantonment and Osmania University. Hyderabad rural district was later renamed as Ranga Reddy District.

Telangana carved out from with 10 districts from Andhra Pradesh. Seven mandals of Bhadrachalam division were given back to East Godavari district. 21 new districts were created on 11 October 2016, which lead to 31 districts in Telangana. All districts were divided into minimum 2 to maximum 5 except Hyderabad district district which was untouched. Two new districts, Mulugu and Narayanpet were created on 17 February 2019, taking the total number of districts to 33.

District statistics 

Hyderabad district is the most populated district with a population of 39,43,323 and Mulugu is the least populated with 2,94,671. Telangana consist of 74 Revenue Divisions and 607 Revenue Mandals (Tehsil).

See also 
 List of mandals in Telangana
 List of districts in India
 List of districts in Telangana by GDP

References 

 
Districts
Telangana